Complete Feedback is one of Charles Hockett's 16 Design features of language which states that speakers are able to hear what they are saying. Through their auditory channels they are able to receive feedback on what they are vocalizing.

References

Language acquisition